Hanyang railway station, located at Cuiwei Street in Hanyang District, Wuhan, Hubei, China, is a station of Jingguang Railway and Handan Railway. It will be the terminus of Inter-city rail, towards Qianjiang, Tianmen. Hangyang railway station is served by a station of the same name on Line 4 of the Wuhan Metro.

Wuhan Metro

Hanyang Railway Station, is a station on Line 4 of the Wuhan Metro. It entered revenue service on December 28, 2014. It is located in Hanyang District and it serves Hanyang railway station.

Station layout

Gallery

References

Railway stations in Wuhan
Stations on the Beijing–Guangzhou Railway
Wuhan Metro stations
Line 4, Wuhan Metro
Railway stations in China opened in 1956